Stanner may refer to

People
Bill Stanner (also known as W.E.H. Stanner), an Australian anthropologist and commander of the 2/1st North Australia Observer Unit
Duncan Stanners, football player who played for Rangers F.C. in the 1953 Scottish Cup Final

Places in the United Kingdom
Stanner, a hamlet in Radnorshire, Wales
 Stanner railway station
Stanner Nab, part of Bulkeley Hill of the Peckforton Hills in Cheshire
Stanner Rocks, an area of igneous rocks in what is called the Stanner-Hanter district near the Welsh border
The Stanners, an area on the south bank of the River Tyne in Corbridge, Northumberland

Other uses
Stanner, a nickname for students and alumni of the Archbishop Molloy High School in Queens, New York City
Stanner Award, an annual award for Indigenous literature in Australia

See also